Alaxmi Ka Super Parivaar, formerly known as Alaxmi - Hamari Super Bahu, is a family Comedy-drama which aired on Life OK. It is based on the Bengali serial, Sansaar Sukher Hoy Romonir Guney, that aired on Star Jalsa.

Plot
Set in the holy city of Dwarka–it is now being currently believed that the city will sink if the Kapadia family in the city does not stop fighting.

The head of the Kapadia family is a man called Natwarlal. His younger brother Mohandas has three sons and three daughters-in-law living with him. The women in the house are constantly fighting amongst themselves and making the men compete and fight. Mohandas has grandchildren also who do not fight amongst themselves but constantly get caught in the crossfire. Natwarlal just wants to abandon the family and lead a peaceful family life elsewhere but Mohandas believes it is his duty to look after his children and grandchildren.

The brothers have split their father's transport business into three setups and fight over clients and cut into each other's business. The elder brother Ram, had been in the lockup for a few days. Instead of helping their brother they had chosen to split the business. The brothers are also suspicious of each other because the 99-year lease to this house had been renewed but has gone missing.

Mohandas's wife Shantiben died twenty two years ago. Post her death he chose the spouses for his three children and rues the days when he made the choice. Although Shantiben is dead and gone to the whole world she loves her husband so much that she still comes and talks to her husband through her photographs and advises him to establish a long holding peace in the house. For bringing prosperity to the house, she believes an antidote is required and the antidote to prosperity is misfortune. She tells him that he will find the antidote once he gets an invitation. Mohandas wonders where the invitation will come from.

Twenty kilometres away from this is a village called Sajjan where an orphan girl lives with her Mama and Mami. Her name is Laxmi but the whole world calls her Alaxmi. Her Mami is very cruel to her and so are two of her cousins but her Mama and one cousin love and care for her. Alaxmi is the leader of the children in the village and she is very friendly with a girl called Mini who is of the same age. It so happens that Mini is set to be married off and the invitation for the same reaches Mohan Das. How? Mini's father is good friend of Mohandas and this is how he gets the invitation.

Mohandas and Natwarlal are somehow reluctant to take the whole bickering family along so they just take along the eldest son's younger son–Kishan along with him to the wedding. At the wedding Mohandas meets and starts observing the antics of Laxmi. He starts to believe that she can set his household right. To top it all she is literally named Alaxmi and she will definitely prove to be the antidote to the constant strife in his house. He realises that Laxmi never cries in the face of adversity and has practical solutions for every problem and therefore she can take care of herself in Kargil.

Kishan wants to study Fashion Design in Ahmedabad at NIID and for this he needs money which his parents are not willing to give him because they don't think it is worth paying for their son's Tailoring Training. Mohandas promises Kishan that he will pay for his education if he agrees to marry Laxmi and send him to Ahmedabad.

Laxmi is married off to Kishan and Kishan finds it difficult to tolerate the antics of his childwoman bride because she refuses to behave like a traditional bahu. But Laxmi is the perfect antidote to problems of this household and she starts setting things right in her own style and not in a preachy manner.

Laxmi realises that it is the split in the business that is at the core of the discord and she makes them realise that they can run a much better business if they get together and become each other's strength. She also stops them from being evicted from the house by finding the lease papers. She does much to help them arrive at total peace. Laxmi also helps Ram absolve himself mof the crime he had never committed.

While Laxmi solves the problems of others and turns them into friends, she begins to face problems of her own. By the time she realises what a husband-wife relationship is, Kishan is already lost to her as Kishan meets a young girl, Kashvi from the rich Sarabhai family of Ahmedabad. Kashvi is his co-student and Kishan is immensely attracted to her. When Kishan is slated to return home he simply tells everyone that he is not coming back to his wife.

The Kapadia family stands with Laxmi this time and decides to support her and help her unite with Kishan just as she has helped them unite.

Cast

References

External links
 
 

Hindi comedy shows
Indian comedy television series
2012 Indian television series debuts
Life OK original programming
2013 Indian television series endings
Hats Off Productions